RAF Bentley Priory was a non-flying Royal Air Force station near Stanmore in the London Borough of Harrow. It was the headquarters of Fighter Command in the Battle of Britain and throughout the Second World War. During the war, two enemy bombs destroyed a wooden hut near the married quarters, a blast from a V-1 flying bomb broke a few windows, the windows in the Officers' Mess were shattered by a V-2 rocket, and a Vickers Wellington crashed outside the Sergeants' Mess.

The Royal Air Force station closed its operations on 30 May 2008, with all units relocating to new accommodation at RAF Northolt, a few miles away.

The station incorporated Bentley Priory, which was originally built in 1766. The house was significantly extended in 1788, by Sir John Soane, for John Hamilton, 1st Marquess of Abercorn. It was the final home of the dowager Queen Adelaide, queen consort of William IV, before her death there in 1849. Afterwards the building was used as a hotel and girls' school before being acquired by the RAF in 1926. The site includes a Grade II* listed Officers' Mess and Italian Gardens. These, together with the park, are designated a Registered Garden Grade II. The land south of the house is the Bentley Priory Nature Reserve, a Site of Special Scientific Interest maintained by Harrow Heritage Trust.

Since its closure, the Officers' Mess has converted into the Bentley Priory Museum with exhibits focusing on the house's role in the Battle of Britain. The grounds have been redeveloped as a private residential housing estate.

History
The Priory building and 40 acres (comprising the present grounds) were sold to the Air Ministry for a sum thought to be about £25,000. Middlesex County Council bought , including the farm in front of the Priory which formed part of the Green Belt and the present Bentley Priory Open Space.

On 26 May 1926, Inland Area (Training Command), a part of the organization of the Air Defence of Great Britain (ADGB) moved into the Priory from Uxbridge. In July 1926, it was renamed 'Training Command' and moved to Market Drayton in Shropshire. As the RAF grew in size the organizational base expanded with it and the foundations were laid for an air defence system which proved to be well in advance of the force it was shortly to oppose.

The service was radically reorganized with the creation of Bomber, Coastal, Fighter and Training Commands. The existing ADGB was dissolved and RAF Fighter Command emerged on 14 July 1936. It left Hillingdon House, at RAF Uxbridge, on this date and moved to Bentley Priory with its first Air Officer Commanding Air Chief Marshal Sir Hugh Dowding. Fighter Command Headquarters remained at the Priory until its merger with the other operational commands in 1968.

A poem translated from Gray's 'Luna Habitabilis' Cambridge 1797 is associated with the Priory. A copy of the poem was given to AOC 11 Gp on 22 November 1989 by the Rt Hon The Lord Harvington, who stated that he had intended reading it out to the House of Commons at the end of the Battle of Britain, but the copy had been lost. At the time Harvington was Wing Commander R G G F Harvington RAuxAF and Conservative member for North St Pancras. He felt it appropriate to quote this 18th-century prophecy:

"The time will come, when thou shalt lift thine eyes,
To watch a long drawn battle in the skies,
While aged peasants, too amazed for words,
Stare at the flying fleets of wond'rous birds,
England so long the mistress of the sea,
Where winds and waves confess her sovereignty,
Her ancient triumph yet on high shall bear,
And reign, the sovereign of the conquered air."
However the quotation is misleading and based on selective editing of the original in which 'the battle' is a fleet of ships invading the moon and the aged peasants are moon-dwellers.

Royal Observer Corps

The Observer Corps moved to RAF Bentley Priory from its original location at RAF Uxbridge, along with Dowding and Fighter Command, in July 1936 and remained at the Priory until it was stood down in December 1995. The Observer Corps was one of the cornerstones of Lord Dowding's air defence system and he said later in his despatch after the Battle of Britain:

"It is important to note that at this time they (the Observer Corps) constituted the whole means of tracking enemy raids once they had crossed the coastline. Their work throughout was quite invaluable. Without it the air-raid warning systems could not have been operated and inland interceptions would rarely have been made."

As a result of their efforts in the Battle of Britain the Observer Corps was granted the title Royal by King George VI and became a uniformed volunteer branch of the RAF from April 1941 for the remainder of its existence. Throughout its service the Royal Observer Corps was commanded by an RAF Air Commodore, each of whom served a tour of between three or four years.

When the Corps' first Commandant Air Commodore Edward Masterman CB CBE AFC RAF(R’td) had stood down in April 1936, Air Commodore Alfred Warrington-Morris CB CMG OBE AFC MiD RAF(R’td) replaced him and took control of the Observer Corps in the important period immediately prior to the Second World War. He oversaw the move of HQ Observer Corps to Bentley Priory and the Corps' adoption by RAF Fighter Command. He also controlled the Corps during the memorable events of the Battle of Britain and was still at the helm when the Observer Corps was granted the title Royal to become the Royal Observer Corps and became a uniformed branch of the RAF. Warrington-Morris was Mentioned in dispatches in July 1940.

The corps was created to provide a system for detecting, tracking and reporting aircraft over Britain. In World War II it was complementary to and often replaced the radar system in that it provided an 'over land' element while radar handled the 'over water approach' requirement. In 1955 the detection and reporting of nuclear blasts and fall-out was introduced. By 1965 the aircraft role was no longer needed and the corps formed the field force for the United Kingdom Warning and Monitoring Organisation (UKWMO) until both organisations were disbanded after the Cold war ended.

Initially the Observer Corps' presence at Bentley Priory included not only the small headquarters' staff of a dozen officers and support staff but also around sixty spare time observers who filled essential plotting tasks in the Bentley Priory operations rooms. In 1955 the observers relocated to a new dedicated ROC operations centre in nearby Watford. By 1968 the ROC headquarters consisted of its Air Commodore, 9 full-time ROC officers and around 15 MoD civilian support staff. The ROC officers, several of whom 'lived in', took a full and active role in the life of the officers' mess and frequently filled mess committee positions.

In 1992, a Royal Observer Corps stained glass window to mark the 50th anniversary of the Battle of Britain, was installed in the officers' mess at RAF Bentley Priory. The window is located by the main door, just inside the corridor leading to the dining room and depicts two observers on duty at an Observer Corps post in central London with contrails overhead. The colourful window was constructed from an original design and drawing by Observer Lieutenant Commander A P Angove FBIM FITD, the Operations Training Officer (Ops Trg) at HQ ROC. The arched window was designed to balance a Royal Air Force stained glass window already located on the other side of the front door.

The 10,000-member main field force of the ROC was stood down on 30 September 1991, and the ROC's original 1966 Royal Banner was laid up at St Clement Danes Church in the Strand, London where it remains on display, a new banner having been presented by HM The Queen in July 1991 during a Royal Review of the ROC and garden party at Bentley Priory. The Corps was dismantled following what was described by the Queen at the Royal Review as "the end of the Cold War" and linked to a Government press release that referred to "possible future developments and improvements in automated nuclear explosion and fallout detection from remote sensors".

The S Ad O, retitled as Senior ROC Officer (SROCO), Observer Commander N A Greig OBE and his adjutant Observer Lieutenant P Proost remained in post to administer the reduced ROC contingent under a revised RAF structure. Only the Nuclear Reporting Cell (NRC) elements of the Corps remained in service, working alongside major armed forces headquarters and they entered a new and highly-uncertain phase. Reduced to less than 300 members in total over the whole UK, the retained NRCs now found themselves tasked with the daunting challenge of providing a comprehensive Nuclear, Biological and Chemical (NBC) warfare analysis and warning service for the Military Home Commands, on a reserve-manned basis as NBCCs but without the previous flow of data from posts and controls.

From 1991 onwards the "Remnant Elements" became a single reserve Directly Administered Unit within RAF Strike Command (RAFSTC). The position of Commandant ROC became a secondary appointment for the Senior Air Staff Officer (SASO) of No. 11 Group RAF at Bentley Priory. All members were required to remove their original ROC Group designations from their RAF uniforms, and to accept moves towards a change in conditions of service in any Transition-To-War (TTW) that would make them effectively members of the Royal Auxiliary Air Force (RAuxAF), with protected rights, and closer links were made with the war-appointable flights of the Royal Air Force Volunteer Reserve (RAFVR).

Despite having successfully built upon the extensive NBC reporting trials, undertaken with the RAF Regiment and meeting full NATO standards and evaluations (STANAGs and OPEVALs), the conclusion reached by the UK MoD was that retention of the Corps in its NBC Cell role was "desirable, but not essential in the existing format". As a consequence, the remaining part-time members of the ROC were stood-down on 31 December 1995, after a laying-up ceremony for the 1991 ROC Banner in the Rotunda at RAF College Cranwell in Lincolnshire on 8 Dec 1995. The ROC Banner remains on display in the RAFC Cranwell rotunda alongside other stood-down Air Force units and squadrons that are subject to liability for reactivation in the future. Headquarters ROC at RAF Bentley Priory finally closed on 31 March 1996 after all administrative winding-up tasks were completed. The last Commandant of the Corps was Air Commodore Martin Widdowson.

Fighter Command

RAF Fighter Command, under Air Chief Marshal Sir Hugh Dowding with Air Commodore A D John Cunningham as his Senior Air Staff Officer (SASO) and Air Commodore N. J. Gill as Air Officer Administration (AOA), consisted of 76 officers, 71 airmen and 84 civilians (including the 70 Observer Corps personnel).

The units administered directly by HQ Fighter Command were No 11 (Fighter) Group, No 77 (Air Co-operation) Group and the Royal Observer Corps (from April 1941). In November 1938, No 3 Balloon Centre RAuxAF under command of Group Captain AE Bald was formed at RAF Stanmore Park and came under the operational umbrella of Dowding. The location details for the 'barrages' were planned at Bentley Priory.

Before World War II broke out in 1939, the Priory underwent many changes. Chief among these was the hurried adaptation of the two largest rooms (now the anteroom and the Ladies room) into the Operations Room and the Filter Room – moved from its original location in the Crypt bar; the classrooms in the east Wing were converted into accommodation. Externally, brown and green paint were sprayed over the outside of the building including the clock face, and many of the windows were blacked out.

Dug-outs were built and sandbags deployed to protect personnel. In 1939, the magnificent conservatory was pulled down and replaced by the Operations staff wooden offices. The scene was now set for the wartime era, which is, in a national context, considered to be the most interesting and significant part of the Priory's history, and that of the RAF.
In January 1939, work started on the underground Operations Block which was occupied and commenced operations on 9 March 1940.

In the Spring of 1940 Air Officer Commanding RAF Fighter Command, Air Chief Marshal Hugh Dowding, by then a widower, lived a very quiet domestic life with his sister Hilda at a house called Montrose (no longer standing) in Stanmore. He rarely went out socially and with an immense work load was happy to forgo all but duty functions. Every morning he would walk through the grounds to his office in the Priory. Dowding would often meet General Frederick Alfred Pile, who was the General Officer Commanding Anti-Aircraft Command, who was walking from his home, Glenthorn. The pair, who were firm friends, would use the time to talk about the war and other subjects. Dowding left visits to other stations in Fighter Command to his Staff Officers as he was much occupied with the work in his Priory office. However, he did pay regular night-time visits to research establishments and the air defences around London when The Blitz started in earnest in September 1940. These visits often followed periods of up to 48 hours at his desk leaving Dowding exhausted. Lord Beaverbrook and Winston Churchill made Dowding unwillingly relinquish command of Fighter Command on 24 November 1940 after he only approved some recommendations in a report to improve night air defences created by a committee of enquiry chaired by Sir John Salmond.

Dowding's time leading Fighter Command left a lasting legacy on the organisation. His creation of the Operations and Filter Rooms, the essential elements of the Command, Control and Communications system, became the cornerstone of the Air Defence System. The system he developed gave air controllers the best chance of scrambling fighter squadrons to intercept Luftwaffe raids before they reached their targets. This rapid, flexible approach was essential because there were insufficient aircraft and crews to keep fighter patrols continuously airborne in 1940.
He also played a significant part in encouraging research into night-fighter equipment and tactics. Historian and Dowding biographer, Robert Wright, who served as Dowding's personal assistant in the Battle of Britain, wrote in his book, Dowding and the Battle of Britain, that even when faced with threats of retirement and constant rebuttal, Dowding continued to give his all to those under him and the RAF service. Dowding noted in a letter Air Ministry in early March 1940, that:
"Apart from the question of discourtesy, which I do not wish to stress, I must point out the lack of consideration involved in delaying a proposal to this nature until ten days before the date of retirement. I have had four retiring dates given to me and now you are proposing a fifth. Before the War, as I told S of S, I should have been glad to retire: now I am anxious to stay, because I feel that there is no one else who will fight as I do when proposals are made which would reduce the Defence Forces of the Country below extreme danger point."

Bentley Priory continued to act as the Headquarters of Fighter Command throughout the Second World War. It assumed additional importance as the Air planning headquarters for D-Day, as the planning for the full operation was conducted at  near Portsmouth, with Montgomery, Eisenhower and Churchill attending a nearby church the evening before the assault. Much of the detailed air planning work was carried out at Kestrel Grove just a few hundred yards away (this building still stands and is now a retirement home). On D-Day, the landings were monitored by King George VI, Winston Churchill and U.S. General Dwight D. Eisenhower in the Allied Expeditionary Air Force War room in the Priory's underground bunker. The German artillery binoculars on display in the Dowding room were brought back on the C-in-C's orders, having been captured from positions overlooking the beaches in France.

In September 1955 the Fighter Command Silver Band performed the first Beating the Retreat ceremony by the RAF in front of the Priory. Dowding's leather-topped desk, many of his papers and other effects still occupy the room in the Officers' Mess which he used as his office, with its views across a stone balcony to the formal Italian garden below. These will remain as part of the building for its future as a museum.

Anti-Aircraft Command
On 1 April 1939, HQ Anti-Aircraft Command (AAC) was formed under General Alan Brooke, but on 28 July 1939, he was suddenly moved to command the British Forces and General Sir Frederick Alfred Pile took over. Anti-Aircraft Command then moved to 'Glenthorn', and the Gordon crest was adopted as the badge of Anti-Aircraft Command. This crest, the 'flexed bow and arrow', can still be seen on a silver bowl, presented to the mess when AAC closed, and is displayed in the Dowding Room. A Plotters School existed in one of the local houses where trainees used bicycles and megaphones to learn how to map incoming enemy aircraft.

Wellington crash
On 16 October 1940 a Vickers Wellington of the Czechoslovak-crewed No. 311 Squadron RAF collided with a cable of one of the barrage balloons protecting Bentley Priory. The aircraft had been on a bombing mission from RAF East Wretham to Kiel, but suffered icing and the failure of its compass and radio and was badly off-course.

The Wellington crashed outside the sergeants' mess, killing five of its six crew. They are buried in a single shared grave at Pinner New Cemetery,  from Bentley Priory.

The tail gunner survived with serious burns. He later retrained as a fighter pilot and served with No. 312 (Czechoslovak) Squadron RAF.

Airstrip
With the requirement for frequent high-level meetings the need for an airstrip at Bentley Priory grew. Air Commodore Richard Atcherley undertook this project. The Air Ministry War Department advised him that it would take six months to construct two  strips, so he approached the Americans. Cinder landing strips were laid in just four days. A Bellman hangar was erected next to the present Mess building.

Flight Sergeant Geoff Elphick RAuxAF, a Battle of Britain pilot with 32 Squadron at Biggin Hill, flew from the Priory from April 1944. On a recent visit he clearly recalled the day that he unceremoniously pulled Air Commodore Atcherley out of an Auster which he had rolled onto its back while landing. He also recalled quietly cutting down some birch trees that were a hazard to aircraft when landing. Arthur Harris also made some hazardous landings and apparently often complained about 'those confounded balloons' which were not far away from the strip.

Post-war operations
After the war, the Priory gradually returned to something of its former self. However, on the night of 10 March 1947, the centre portion of the building, including the room above the Ante-Room and the offices on the floor above, were destroyed by a fire. Two years later, a new bar was built in the sub-basement under the Ante-Room. HRH Princess Elizabeth first visited the Priory in 1950.

At some stage the wooden accommodation block was replaced with the three-storey building immediately to the west of the Mess and in 1953 a Conference Room was constructed on the second floor. Further restoration of the exterior of the building followed in 1954, together with the extension and modernisation of the Officers' Mess kitchen and servery.

In 1955, the dining room was enlarged and rebuilt with a new roof. All this renovation was complete by 1958 when the Queen and other members of the Royal Family attended the RAF 40th Anniversary celebrations which were held at Bentley Priory.

Despite the considerable work undertaken, it became apparent that deterioration was still taking place. In 1964, a surveyor's report showed that the Ante-Room rebuilt in 1947 was suffering from dry rot. However, it was not until ten years later that the full extent of the decay was thoroughly investigated.

In 1966, the clock face received an extensive overhaul. Made by John Moore in 1864, the clock was one of the last to be made before the gravity escapement principle was introduced. It was wound weekly and had a  pendulum with a two and a quarter second beat. The clock was lost in the fire of 1979 but the original bells survived.

On 30 April 1968, Fighter Command was amalgamated with other operational commands to form Strike Command. The Fighter Command badge remains above the main entrance Headquarters No 11 (Fighter) Group. The Officers' Mess remained in the Priory building and much of the Mess silver still proudly bears the Fighter Command Badge.

Bentley Priory also became the Administrative Headquarters for RAF Strike Command (although this function moved to High Wycombe in 1972). It was also proposed that the Officer and Aircrew selection at RAF Biggin Hill should move to the Priory and Stanmore itself closed. All these plans required a large Officers' Mess and in 1974 the Department of the Environment ordered a thorough investigation into the priory building. Their findings were extremely disturbing; the spread of dry rot in the timbers meant that the only safe parts of the Mess were the kitchens and dining room, and these would only last until March 1975 when they too would have to be closed. From this period dates the large underground nuclear hardened bunker to the east of the mansion, built in 1982 which replaced the previous World War II bunker on the site, which had been continually upgraded from 1940 up to the 1980s.

The decision that the Mess would have to close came at a particularly bad time as, some four months earlier, the Royal Air Force Association had been given permission to hold a Fighter Command Commemorative Ball at the Priory and invitations had already been sent out. Given the serious concern about the integrity of the building's structure it was decided to use marquees for the majority of the function; the lower floors were temporarily strengthened. The ball was of course, a resounding success and caused HM the Queen Mother, who has a long association with the Mess, to be particularly interested in the Priory's future. It was from that night that the campaign to save the Priory really began and it was eventually decided that the Priory should be renovated at a cost of approximately £1 million. Most of the paintings and other valuables were taken to RAF Quedgeley for safe storage, and Cubitts, sub-contractors of the Department of the Environment, started work.

Fire
On the evening of 21 June 1979 at 8:27 pm, smoke was seen coming from the Priory. The London Fire Brigade fortunately arrived in good time and tried to fight the fire. Several teams went inside and tried to get the fire under control. Unfortunately, the electricity had not been switched off and as the firemen advanced to the seat of the fire, they were surrounded by great sparks and had to beat a hasty retreat. The firemen spent the next morning damping down the smouldering remains and looking for the cause. It was quickly established that the fire was an accident and not arson.

The fire devastated most of the main staircase, but luckily jumped over the Adelaide Room, by-passing the Rotunda, but destroying the rooms down the other side, including the Dowding Room. Initially, this fire was thought to be the final tragedy. However, after legal ramifications were resolved, Cubitts's insurance covered most of the cost of rebuilding and renovations went ahead at a cost of approximately £3.1 million.

Despite two fires and substantial Victorian rebuilding of the house, externally, Soane's part in the design is still evident on the garden side and in the house. The five pilasters (columns) set against the original Duberley house still survive, though they have lost most of their entablature (the ornate area above the column) and carry instead a steeply projecting slate roof.

Although several of the rooms were built in the 18th century, alterations to most of them have led to the loss of their original character. Only the entrance hall remains virtually intact with its eight 'Roman Doric' columns supporting a shallow vaulted ceiling. The 1979 fire peeled off the whitewash paint cover of the ceiling revealing the intricate painted pattern (as designed by Sloane). Although the finances did not allow this pattern to be restored at the time, it has since been returned to its former glory by Mess members. A second small fire was started while restoration was under way in 1980 cause of the fire was work lights left on over night.

Closure
RAF Bentley Priory was latterly home to the Defence Aviation Safety Centre, Air Historical Branch (AHB) and RAF Ceremonial. As there was no enduring operational use for RAF Bentley Priory, however, the Ministry of Defence (MoD) released the site as part of its Greater London estate consolidation project, Project MoDEL (Ministry of Defence Estates London).

Project MoDEL is making a major contribution to the consolidation of the Defence Estate in Greater London through the delivery of three key outputs: the development of an integrated 'core site' at RAF Northolt; the re-location of the London-based units; and the disposal of surplus sites. Accordingly, DASC, AHB and RAF Ceremonial relocated to RAF Northolt in 2008 following the completion of their new accommodation. A total of £180 million GBP ($295 million US in 2008) of the £300 million GBP released from Project MoDEL has been re-invested back into RAF Northolt.

A final dinner was held for the Battle of Britain veterans in July 2007 to celebrate the role of the building and those who worked in it in preventing Hitler's planned air invasion of Britain in 1940. The sunset ceremony was carried out by the Queen's Colour Squadron and there was a flypast by the Battle of Britain Memorial Flight and a Eurofighter Typhoon. The salute was taken by the Station Commander Squadron Leader Phil Reid, the Chief of the Air Staff Air Chief Marshal Sir Glenn Torpy and Air Commodore (Ret) Pete Brothers, Chairman of the Battle of Britain Fighter Association.
 
The final closure Sunset ceremony took place on 30 May 2008, when the RAF ensign was lowered at RAF Bentley Priory for the last time. The station officially closed the following day, and all remaining lodger units moved to RAF Northolt.

Bentley Priory Museum
The former Bentley Priory Officers' Mess, which became the Bentley Priory Museum in September 2013, includes the original office of Air Chief Marshal Sir Hugh Dowding (later Lord Dowding), Air Officer Commanding-in-Chief Fighter Command in the Battle of Britain, preserved with its original furniture. Other Battle of Britain historic artefacts are kept in the Museum, including one of the few remaining Battle of Britain Lace Panels.

Other items in the Museum include a number of "trophies" taken by the Royal Air Force from the Luftwaffe at the end of World War II, including an eagle statue and a bust of Hermann Göring.

The Officers' Mess was also notable for the number of Royal Portraits hanging in the building; there were two of HM The Queen, one in the Dining Room as a young woman and a second that hung in the Ladies' Room that was commissioned and paid for by the Royal Observer Corps to mark their 50th Jubilee Year, painted at Bentley Priory depicting Her Majesty in her ROC Commandant in Chief regalia and with a background of the Italian Gardens. There was also a portrait of His Royal Highness the Duke of Edinburgh (dressed in a flying suit, hanging in the Dining Room on the wall facing the Queen), one of George VI (in RAF No 1 uniform wearing a 'chip bag' and wings, which hangs in the Abercorn Bar) and one of The Queen Mother (gifted to the Mess by the Queen Mother after she paid for refurbishment following the fire). The portrait of The Queen Mother hung in the rotunda and was surrounded by portraits and sketches of many Battle of Britain Pilots. These portraits have now all been preserved in the Museum.

Redevelopment
Following the closure of the RAF station the site was handed over to Defence Estates, who in turn passed it to the prime plus contractor for Project MoDEL, VSM Estates, a company formed by developers Vinci PLC and St. Modwen Properties PLC, who are responsible for developing proposals and the subsequent disposal of the site to developers who will realise the scheme.

Under Supplementary planning guidance agreed in 2007 by London Borough of Harrow the site will include a museum open to the public in the main rooms of the house, recording and interpreting the history of the site and in particular the Battle of Britain and Cold War heritage. The plans were put on hold in 2009 as a result of the economic climate in Britain, although in 2010 it was agreed that the museum would go ahead and be run by the Bentley Priory Battle of Britain Trust, with support from the charity The Prince's Regeneration Trust. The latest plans for the site include the conversion of the grade II* listed mansion into luxury flats, above the museum. The restoration and classical style development for the site is being designed by Nigel Anderson of ADAM Architecture.

On 12 September 2013, the Bentley Priory Museum was officially opened by Prince Charles and the Duchess of Cornwall.

The Cold War bunker was surveyed by English Heritage, who concluded there were other examples of similar bunkers across the country in better condition. In March 2010 the bunker was filled in, leaving only the exterior doors and walls. The RAF Bentley Priory Battle of Britain Trust supported VSM Estates in the decision to fill in the bunker on the grounds of maintenance costs. The bunker had replaced the Second World War bunker in the 1980s.

See also
List of former Royal Air Force stations
Bentley Priory
Bentley Priory Nature Reserve

References
Citations

Bibliography

External links

Bentley Priory
Buildings and structures in the London Borough of Harrow
Battle of Britain
Monasteries in London
History of the London Borough of Harrow
Bentley Priory
Stanmore
1936 establishments in England
Military installations established in 1936
Military installations closed in 2008
World War II museums in London